Wangtun Township is a township of Yuwangtai District, Kaifeng, Henan, China.

See also
List of township-level divisions of Henan

References

Township-level divisions of Henan